Undercover Wedding Crashers is a 2021 Spanish action comedy film directed by Carlos Therón which stars Julián López, Natalia de Molina, Carlos Librado and Miren Ibarguren, among others. It is an adaptation of the 2013 Italian film Song'e Napule.

Plot 
The fiction is set in Cádiz. Sebas, a police agent with musical training, goes undercover as a keyboard player in a flamenco-trap band, Los Lolos, which is about to perform at the wedding of the daughter of an important narco.

Cast

Production 
Undercover Wedding Crashers is a remake of the 2013 Italian film Song'e Napule by Antonio and Marco Manetti. It was written by Manuel Burque and Josep Gatell. The film was produced by Telecinco Cinema, La Pepa Films and La Pepa La Película A.I.E, in association with La Zona Films and Quexito Films. It had the participation of Mediaset España, Movistar+ and Mediterráneo Mediaset España Group and funding from the ICAA.

Filming lasted for seven weeks. Shooting locations included the provinces of Seville and Cádiz.

Release 
Initially intended to be theatrically released in Spain on 13 March 2020, the release was postponed to 11 September 2020 due to the COVID-19 pandemic, which caused the shelving of all Telecinco Cinema titles pending for theatrical release. Postponed again, its release was eventually re-scheduled for 24 June 2021.

The film was screened (as part of the festival's official selection but out of the competition) at the Málaga Spanish Film Festival on 4 June 2021. The film was distributed by Buena Vista International. The release of the movie was extensively teased by Mediaset España in all its television stations (including Euro 2020 matches), to the extent that the reiteration generated online memes about it. The film grossed €3.3 million at the box-office.

Reception 
Raquel Hernández Luján of HobbyConsolas gave the film a score of 70/100, praising the well played humour and the "sensational" comic talent of the cast. She negatively pointed out that the ending was too cheesy.

Beatriz Martínez of El Periódico de Catalunya gave the film 4 stars out of 5, writing that it had a "good screenplay, good cast and jokes that are not cringeworthy".
 
Juan Pando of Fotogramas gave the film 4 out of 5 stars. In his view, the screenplay written by Burque and Gatell featured "simple but effective jokes". He pointed out at the predominance of "lighthearted humour", despite the crime themes. He praised the comedy talent and the chemistry of the cast.

Andrea G. Bermejo of Cinemanía gave it 4 out of 5 stars, presenting Operación Camarón as "a film that respects the rich intonations of our (Spanish) geographic diversity with actors who are natives or have mastered the (regional) accents perfectly".

Javier Ocaña of El País found his only possible objection towards the film to be that the film was a remake of an Italian title, insofar that circumstance entailed an "evident lack of risk-taking capacity and less creativity". He considered however that the film actually delivered better "rhythm, staging, editing, dialogues, comic timing, tempo and performances" than the original Italian version.

Josu Eguren of El Correo gave the film 2 out of 3 stars, deeming it "refreshing, lively and catchy". He pointed out at the "priceless" bitchy deliveries by Miren Ibarguren, who is claiming—according to the reviewer—"the title of best comedic actress" in Spain.

Awards and nominations 

|-
| align = "center" rowspan = "2" | 2021 || rowspan = "2" | 34th ASECAN Awards || Best Actress || Natalia de Molina ||  || rowspan = "2" | 
|-
| Best Original Score || Riki Rivera || 
|-
| align = "center" rowspan = "9" | 2022 || rowspan = "9" | 1st Carmen Awards || Best Production Supervision || Manuela Ocón ||  || rowspan = "9" | 
|-
| Best Original Song || Riki Rivera & Violeta Arriaza || 
|-
| Best Original Score || Riki Rivera || 
|-
| Best Makeup and Hairstyles || Yolanda Piña & Félix Terrero || 
|-
| rowspan = "2" | Best New Actor || Juanlu González || 
|-
| Xisco González || 
|-
| Best Sound || Dani de Zayas || 
|-
| Best Supporting Actress || Natalia de Molina || 
|-
| Best Costume Design || Esther Vaquero || 
|}

See also 
 List of Spanish films of 2021

References

External links
 Undercover Wedding Crashers at ICAA's Catálogo de Cinespañol
 
2021 films
2021 action comedy films
Spanish remakes of Italian films
Buena Vista International films
2020s Spanish-language films
Spanish crime comedy films
Spanish action comedy films
Films set in Andalusia
Cádiz in fiction
Films shot in the province of Cádiz
Films shot in the province of Seville
2020s Spanish films